is a series of science fantasy role-playing video games by Square Enix. The series originated on the Game Boy in 1989 as the creation of Akitoshi Kawazu at Square. It has since continued across multiple platforms, from the Super NES to the PlayStation 2. The series is notable for its emphasis on open world exploration, non-linear branching plots, and occasionally unconventional gameplay. This distinguishes the games from most of Square's other franchises.

Development 

The SaGa series was created by game designer Akitoshi Kawazu, whose contributions prior to the franchise's introduction include Final Fantasy and Final Fantasy II. At a time when Nintendo's Game Boy was becoming popular worldwide due to the puzzle game Tetris, then-Square president Masashi Miyamoto requested that a development team create a game for the handheld console. Kawazu and fellow designer Koichi Ishii suggested that the company develop a role-playing video game, thus making Makai Toushi Sa·Ga, later released in North America as The Final Fantasy Legend, the company's first handheld title. The gameplay was designed to be difficult, described by Kawazu as the main difference between the SaGa and Final Fantasy series. The character illustrations in all the games in the SaGa series were done by Tomomi Kobayashi, who has also done the illustrations for the MMORPG Granado Espada. Although it has been a long-running series, as of 2008, none of the ten production teams at Square Enix is assigned to the franchise. Akitoshi Kawazu and Production Team 2 are devoted to the Final Fantasy Crystal Chronicles series.

Common elements
The SaGa series emphasizes nonlinear gameplay and open world exploration, with its open-ended branching plot and free style of character development separating it from the more linear Final Fantasy series, which was ahead of its time  Like the Final Fantasy series, however, the story in each SaGa share little to no continuity to one another.

The SaGa series is also considered a successor to Final Fantasy II, which introduced a more open-ended activity-based progression system that was abandoned by later Final Fantasy games but embraced by Makai Toushi SaGa (The Final Fantasy Legend), which expanded it with weapons that shatter with repeated use and added new ideas such as a race of monsters that mutate depending on which fallen foes they consume.

The early games in the series also feature some common gameplay elements and themes first established in Final Fantasy, such as random enemy encounters, but most of these disappear with the Romancing SaGa games, providing a unique gameplay experience. It also features a similar turn-based battle system, where a character's prowess is driven by numerical values called "statistics" which, in turn, increase with combat experience. Given the open-ended aspect of gameplay and the ability to play through multiple character scenarios, heavy emphasis is placed upon the replay value of SaGa games.

Since the original Makai Toushi SaGa, much of the series has relied on loosely connected stories and sidequests rather than an epic narrative. Makai Toushi SaGa allowed players to travel through different worlds. Romancing SaGa expanded the open-endedness by offering many choices and allowing players to complete quests in any order, with the decision of whether or not to participate in any particular quest affecting the outcome of the storyline. The game also allowed players to choose from eight different characters, each with their own stories that start in different places and offer different outcomes. Romancing SaGa thus succeeded in providing a very different experience during each run through the game, something that later non-linear RPGs such as SaGa Frontier and Fable had promised but were unable to live up to. It also introduced a combo system where up to five party members can perform a combined special attack, and required characters to pay mentors to teach them abilities, whether it is using certain weapons or certain proficiencies like opening a chest or dismantling a trap.

While in the original Romancing SaGa, scenarios were changed according to dialogue choices during conversations, Romancing SaGa 2 further expanded the open-endedness by having unique storylines for each character that can change depending on the player's actions, including who is chosen, what is said in conversation, what events have occurred, and who is present in the party. Romancing SaGa 3 featured a storyline that could be told differently from the perspectives of up to eight different characters and introduced a level-scaling system where the enemies get stronger as the characters do, a mechanic that was later used in Final Fantasy VIII, The Elder Scrolls IV: Oblivion, Silverfall, Dragon Age: Origins, Fallout 3, and The Elder Scrolls V: Skyrim. SaGa Frontier further expanded on the non-linear gameplay of its Romancing SaGa predecessors, with a setting that spans multiple planets and an overarching plot that becomes apparent after playing through each of the different characters' quests that tie together at certain places.

Games 

{{Video game table|body=
{{Video game table item
| title=The Final Fantasy Legend
| release1=December 15, 1989
| release2=September 30, 1990
| release3=December 19, 2020 (Nintendo Switch)
| notes=
Released on Game Boy
Developed by Square
Also available on Wonderswan Color (2002), i-mode (2007), EZweb (2007), SoftBank Mobile (2008), Nintendo Switch (2020), Android (2021), iOS (2021), Windows (2021)
Known in Japan as Makai Toushi Sa・Ga
The first RPG on a handheld video game console, and the first handheld game with a battery save feature. The game introduces new systems of developing characters. The game was released in North America less than a year later as The Final Fantasy Legend to boost sales on the strength of Final Fantasy'''s name, something also done with the Mana series. An enhanced remake of the game was released exclusively in Japan in 2002 for the WonderSwan Color and 2007 for mobile phones, sporting more advanced graphics than those displayed by the Game Boy's four-color set.
}}

}}

Music

Music in the SaGa series have been composed by a number of people, the most prominent of which is Kenji Ito, who also composed some soundtracks for the Mana series. Nobuo Uematsu, responsible for a large portion of the music of the Final Fantasy series, solely composed The Final Fantasy Legend and co-composed Final Fantasy Legend II with Ito. Ryuji Sasai and Chihiro Fujioka worked on Final Fantasy Legend III together. SaGa Frontier 2 and Unlimited Saga are credited to Masashi Hamauzu.

Reception

Games in the SaGa series have been popular in Japan, with many of them selling over 1 million units. As of March 2011, the series has sold over 9.9 million units. In 2006, Famitsu readers voted Romancing SaGa as the 53rd best game of all time, and SaGa 2 as the 94th best game of all time. Games in the series also received generally positive reviews from Japanese publications such as Famitsu and Dengeki. As of 2019, the series has sold over 10 million units.

However, the series has remained decidedly less popular in North America, many of the games receiving mixed reviews from printed and online publications. It has been suggested that this is due to the series' seemingly experimental gameplay and allowing the player to freely roam with little direction or narrative, atypical of what many North American gamers usually expect from Japanese role-playing games. In their September 2004 "Overrated/Underrated" article, Official U.S. PlayStation Magazine cited the SaGa series as one ruined in the transition to the PlayStation 2, citing primarily Unlimited SaGa.

See alsoThe Legend of Legacy - a spiritual sequel made by some of the past SaGa staff.The Alliance Alive - a second game made by some of the past SaGa'' staff.
 List of Square Enix video game franchises
 List of Japanese role-playing game franchises

References

External links
Official website
SaGa 20th Anniversary website 

 
Role-playing video games
Square Enix franchises
Square Enix games
Video game franchises introduced in 1989